This is a list of video games developed or published by Microids under its current and former labels.

List 
 Grand Prix 500 cc (1986)
 Rodeo (1986)
 Demonia (1986)
 Superbike Challenge (1987)
 Downhill Challenge / Super Ski (1987)
 Highway Patrol (1989)
 Chicago 90 (1989)
 Highway Patrol 2 (1990)
 Super Ski 2 (1990)
 Eagle's Rider (1990)
 Sliders (1991)
 Killerball (1991)
 Grand Prix 500 2 (1991)
 Nicky Boom (1992)
 Action Sport (1993)
 Super Sport Challenge (1993)
 Genesia/Ultimate Domain (1993)
 Nicky 2 (1993)
 Super Ski 3 (1994)
 Ultimate Domain (1994)
 Carlos (1994)
 Fort Boyard - The Challenge (1995)
 Evidence: The Last Report (1996)
 Secret Mission (1996)
 Saban's Iznogoud (1997)
 Des chiffres et des lettres (1997)
 Rising Lands (1997)
 Shogo: Mobile Armor Division (1998)
 Amerzone: The Explorer's Legacy (1999)
 Corsairs: Conquest at Sea (1999)
 Dracula: Resurrection (1999)
 Speed Demons (1999)
 Empire of the Ants (2000)
 Far Gate (2000)
 Warm Up! (2000)
 Fort Boyard (2001)
 Monster Racer (2001)
 Road to India: Between Hell and Nirvana (2001)
 Open Kart (2001)
 Tennis Masters Series (2001)
 Times of Conflict (2001)
 Druuna: Morbus Gravis (2001)
 Snow cross, developed by Vicarious Visions (2001)
 X'treme Roller (2001)
 Kohan: Battles of Ahriman (2002)
 Syberia (2002)
 Post Mortem (2002)
 War and Peace: 1796–1815 (2002)
 Warrior Kings (2002)
 Casper (2002)
 Jack the Ripper (2004)
 Syberia II (2004)
 Still Life (2005)
 Jules Verne's Journey to the Center of the Moon (2005)
 Sinking Island (October 2007)
 Nostradamus: The Last Prophecy (2007)
 Dracula 3 - The Path of the Dragon (2008)
 Still Life 2 (2009)
 Return to Mysterious Island II (2009)
 Red Johnson's Chronicles (2011)
 Red Johnson's Chronicles - One Against All (2012)
 Crazy Cars: Hit the Road (2012)
 Louisiana Adventure (2013)
 Nicolas Eymerich, The Inquisitor: Book 1 - The Plague (2013)
 Dracula 4: The Shadow of the Dragon (2013)
 Dream Chamber (2013)
 Dracula 5: The Blood Legacy (2013)
 9 Elefants (2014)
 Nicolas Eymerich, The Inquisitor: Book 2 - The Village (2015)
 Subject 13 (2015)
 Agatha Christie: The ABC Murders (2016)
 The Descendant (2016)
 Moto Racer 4 (2016)
 Yesterday Origins (2016)
 Syberia III (2017)
 Gear.Club Unlimited (2017)
 Asterix & Obelix XXL 2 (2018)
 Toki (2018)
 Asterix & Obelix XXL 3: The Cristal Menhir (2019)
 Blacksad: Under the Skin (2019)
 Asterix & Obelix XXL Romastered (2020)
 The Bluecoats: North & South (2020)
 Who Wants To Be A Millionaire? (2020)
 XIII (2020)
 Beyond a Steel Sky (2021)
 The Smurfs: Mission Vileaf (2021)
 Marsupilami: Hoobadventure (2021)
 Asterix & Obelix: Slap them All! (2021)
 Alfred Hitchcock – Vertigo (2021)
 Syberia: The World Before (2022)
 Flashback 2 (2023)
 Arkanoid: Eternal Battle (2022)
 Garfield: Lasagna Party (2022)

References

Microids